Cross My Palm is the eleventh studio album by Japanese singer Akina Nakamori, released on 25 August 1987 by Warner Pioneer. It was Nakamori's first English-language album.

Background
Cross My Palm is the second studio album to be recorded in the United States, five years after her debut album Prologue (Jomaku) and the first studio album to be produced by western musicians and writers as David Batteau, Tony Humecke, Roger Daltrey, Julia Downes and Sandy Stewart.

Nakamori come up with the inspiration of this album from American films such as Top Gun and Footloose.

"Modern Woman" is a cover of "Femmes d'aujourd'hui" by French singer Jeanne Mas and the title track is a cover of the song by British writer Chris Morris.

"The Look That Kills" is an English-language self-cover of her 1987 No. 1 hit "Blonde". The single was released two months before the album's release. While the melody line resembles to the original, she performs it in the higher key tune than original, arrangement is slightly renewed and is sixteen seconds shorter.

Marketing

Pioneer Corporation's television commercial
"Modern Woman" was used by Pioneer Corporation in a commercial to promote the Private CD770D mini component stereo system.

Music video album
Four months after the release of album, a companion music video album was released on 21 December 1987. The video album features Nakamori as a musician who aims to go professional. It was filmed in New York City between 13 and 24 April 1987. "No More" includes a new remixed intro not found in the album version. The video received an award at the AVA Digital Content Grand Prix in 1987.

Photo book
The companion photo book  was released on 24 December 1987.

Stage performances
On Fuji TV's music show Yoru no Hit Studio, Nakamori performed "Soft Touch" in Paris in 1989. She performed "The Look That Kills" on the 25 December 1987 episode of TV Asahi's Music Station.

Some tracks were performed in her live shows as well: During the live tour for A Hundred Days in 1987 she performed "Soft Touch", "Political Moves", and "The Look That Kills". She performed "Cross My Palm", "My Position", "Soft Touch", "The Look That Kills" and "No More" in the 1991 special live show "Yume".

Chart performance
Cross My Palm hit No. 1 on Oricon's weekly albums chart and sold 347,700 copies. The album remained at number 19 on Oricon's yearly albums chart in 1987.

The album was released in the United States in 1989 under Atlantic Records; however, it sold poorly in the country, peaking at No. 90 on the Billboard 200.

Track listing

Notes:
"Modern Woman" is titled as "Modern Woman (Femme d'aujourd'hui)" in the album liner notes.

References

1987 albums
Akina Nakamori albums
Warner Music Japan albums
English-language Japanese albums